This is a list of films released in Japan in 1960. In 1960, there were 7457 movie theatres in Japan, with 5132 showing only domestic films and 1531 showing both domestic and imported films. In total, there were 547 Japanese films released in 1960. In total, domestic films grossed 31,065 million yen in 1960.

List of films

See also
1960 in Japan

References

Footnotes

Sources

External links
Japanese films of 1960 at the Internet Movie Database

1960
Lists of 1960 films by country or language
Films